Miji may refer to:

Miji language, a Sino-Tibetan language
Miji people, an ethnic group of north-east India

See also 
 Mije (disambiguation)